Bhagamati (Hyder Mahal) was a queen of Sultan Muhammad Quli Qutb Shah, in whose honor Hyderabad was supposedly named. She is also known by the name Bhagyawati There exists debate among scholars about whether there existed any Bhagamati at all and whether she influenced the naming.

Popular narrative 
Bhagmati was born in 'Chichlam' (place not identified with certainty) in a Hindu family; she was a local nautch-girl. Qutb Shah met her whilst riding out, fell in love to the extent of having constructed Purana Pul as a means of meeting her regularly, and entered into a marriage. Accordingly, the sultan founded a city around her birth-place and named it "Bhaganagar" or "Bhāgyanagar" in her honor. After she converted to Islam and adopted the title Hyder Mahal, the city was renamed Hyderabad.

Scholarly debates 
That Purana pul was completed in 1578 after 2 years of construction; Qutb Shah (b:1566) was romancing Bhagmati as young as ten years. Furthermore, no tomb was built over her last remains unlike other leading female figures of the court; no inscription or coin of that period mentions her name. The chroniclers who mentioned of her were either from North of the Sultanate, who did not visit Hyderabad or foreigners, who arrived long after her death; contemporary Deccani sources including Qutb Shah himself don't mention of her at all. The conferral of 'Hyder', an immensely sacred Islamic attribute on a nautch-girl has been doubted as well. All these cast significant doubts on the authenticity of Bhagmati's existence.

Some however assert that the historicity of multiple sources can't be rejected as hearsay due to their foreign nature, sources exist in that the State Museum in Public Gardens has a portrait of her commissioned around 1750, and that her conspicuous absence from Deccani sources were a result of damnatio memoriae. Others believe Bhagnagar (which was indeed named after her) was a separate village which has nothing to do with today's Hyderabad.

References

Year of birth missing
Year of death missing
People from Hyderabad State
Indian queen consorts
Qutb Shahi dynasty
Telugu people
16th-century Indian women
16th-century Indian people